Pfaffia is a genus of plants in the family Amaranthaceae.

Species
, Plants of the World Online accepted the following species:

Pfaffia acutifolia (Moq.) O.Stützer
Pfaffia aphylla Suess.
Pfaffia argyrea Pedersen
Pfaffia brunae Marchior.
Pfaffia cipoana Marchior., Miotto & J.C.Siqueira
Pfaffia densipellita Borsch
Pfaffia denudata (Moq.) Kuntze
Pfaffia elata R.E.Fr.
Pfaffia eriocephala Suess.
Pfaffia fruticulosa Suess.
Pfaffia glabrata Mart.
Pfaffia gleasonii Suess.
Pfaffia glomerata (Spreng.) Pedersen
Pfaffia gnaphalioides (L.f.) Mart.
Pfaffia helichrysoides (Moq.) Kuntze
Pfaffia hirtula Mart.
Pfaffia iresinoides (Kunth) Spreng.
Pfaffia jubata Mart.
Pfaffia minarum Pedersen
Pfaffia miraflorensis Agudello & P.Franco
Pfaffia ninae Pedersen
Pfaffia nudicaulis Suess.
Pfaffia patiensis Agudelo
Pfaffia rotundifolia Pedersen
Pfaffia rupestris Marchior., Miotto & J.C.Siqueira
Pfaffia sarcophylla Pedersen
Pfaffia sericantha (Mart.) Pedersen
Pfaffia siqueiriana Marchior. & Miotto
Pfaffia tayronensis Agudelo
Pfaffia townsendii Pedersen
Pfaffia tuberculosa Pedersen
Pfaffia tuberosa (Spreng.) Hicken
Pfaffia velutina Mart.

Former species 
Pfaffia paniculata - Suma root, Brazilian ginseng, now classified as Hebanthe erianthos

Footnotes

Amaranthaceae
Amaranthaceae genera
Taxa named by Carl Friedrich Philipp von Martius